The 2015–16 TCU Horned Frogs women's basketball team represents Texas Christian University in the 2015–16 NCAA Division I women's basketball season. The 2015–16 season is head coach Raegan Pebley's second season at TCU.  The Horned Frogs are members of the Big 12 Conference and have played their home games in Schollmaier Arena since its re-opening on December 20, 2015, following a $72 million renovation.  Prior to the Arena's opening, the Horned Frogs played early-season non-conference games in the TCU University Recreation Center.

The Horned Frogs compiled an 8–3 non-conference record before opening Big 12 Conference play on December 30, 2015, at Texas Tech. As a 10-team league, the Big 12 plays an 18-game, double-round robin conference schedule, with each team facing every other team twice, once at home and once on the road.

They finished the season 18–15, 8–10 in Big 12 play to finish in a tie for sixth place. They lost in the first round of the Big 12 women's tournament to Kansas. They received an at-large bid to the Women's National Invitation Tournament where they defeated Texas–Rio Grande and Eastern Michigan in the first and second rounds before losing to UTEP in the third round.

Roster

Schedule and results 

|-
!colspan=9 style="background:#4d1979; color:#FFFFFF;"| Exhibition

|-
!colspan=9 style="background:#4d1979; color:#FFFFFF;"| Non-Conference Games

|-
!colspan=9 style="background:#4d1979; color:#FFFFFF;"| Conference Games

|-
!colspan=9 style="background:#4d1979; color:#FFFFFF;"|  Big 12 women's basketball tournament

|-
!colspan=9 style="background:#4d1979; color:#FFFFFF;"|  WNIT

Schedule and results from GoFrogs.com

Rankings
2015–16 NCAA Division I women's basketball rankings

See also 
 2015–16 TCU Horned Frogs men's basketball team

References 

TCU
TCU Horned Frogs women's basketball seasons
2016 Women's National Invitation Tournament participants